Bruce Robert Stewart (4 September 1925 – ) was a scriptwriter best known for his scripts for television.  Originally from New Zealand, he lived for several years in Australia, working in the theatre, before moving to the United Kingdom in the early 1960s.  There he worked on many projects for both the BBC and ITV, notably Out of the Unknown and Timeslip.

Biography
Stewart was born in Auckland. For three years he studied to be a priest at  Marist seminary. He then moved into the entertainment industry. He would perform songs and tell stories as a forces entertaininer, then moved into radio in Auckland, where he worked as a radio announcer and actor. In 1947 Stewart moved to Sydney, Australia where he got work as a radio announcer. He became an actor, appearing in radio dramas, as well as acting in stage plays in the evening. His breakthrough performance as a radio actor was in a production of Morning Departure.

TV scripts
A Time of the Serpent (1958)
The Land of the Long White Cloud (1958) - serial
Shadow of a Pale Horse (1959)
The Devil Makes Sunday (1962)
Jezebel (1963) (TV series) - story editor
Day of the Drongo (1964)
The Harp in the South (1964) - BBC adaptation
Boney and the Monster (1972)
Old Man March is Dead (1976) - BBC play
Secret Valley (1984) - TV series
Professor Poopsnagle's Steam Zeppelin (1986) - TV series

Radio plays
The Mystery of a Hansom Cab (1958) - BBC radio adaptation
Time of the Serpent (1958)
Low Voice in Rama (1960)
The Hot and Copper Sky (1962)
Flower of Blood (1991) - BBC

Novels
A Disorderly Girl (1978)
The Hot and Copper Sky (1981)

References

External links

Bruce Stewart at AustLit

1925 births
2005 deaths
20th-century New Zealand dramatists and playwrights
20th-century Australian dramatists and playwrights
British male dramatists and playwrights
20th-century British dramatists and playwrights
20th-century British male writers
20th-century New Zealand male writers
20th-century Australian male writers
New Zealand male dramatists and playwrights
Australian male dramatists and playwrights